Presidential elections were held in Moldova on 8 December 1991. Due to a boycott by the Popular Front of Moldova, Mircea Snegur was the only candidate to contest the elections and was elected unopposed.

Background
The elections were held amid high ethnic tensions, with separatists in Gagauzia and Transnistria declaring they would not participate in the elections.

Results

References

1991 elections in Moldova
Moldova
1991 in Moldova
Presidential elections in Moldova